Rolfodon goliath is an extinct species of large frilled shark that lived during the Late Campanian stage of the Late Cretaceous in Angola's southern Benguela Basin. It was described by Miguel Telles Antunes and Henri Cappetta in 2002 during the beginning stages of the PaleoAngola project. Originally it was described as a species belonging to the genus Chlamydoselachus; Cappetta, Morrison & Adnet (2019) transferred it to the chlamydoselachid genus Rolfodon.

The holotype, MUS ANG 23, is rather large. This tooth is about 20mm high, and is characterised by straightened, upright cusps with smooth enameloid which lack ornamentation.

References

Chlamydoselachidae
Cretaceous fish of Africa